Leeds hip hop or New Yorkshire hip hop is the style of hip hop found in the epicentre of the New Yorkshire hip-hop movement that originated in West Yorkshire, England during the 2000s. Leeds hip hop has been noted as a revival of the purist forms of underground hip-hop and stylised by adopting classic elements of East Coast sounds which complement the Leeds underground.

Musical style
Leeds hip hop is a form of hip hop music that combines the elements of US East Coast boom bap drum patterns with the rhythms of R&B and funk along with UK rap and jazz

In contrast to the simplistic rhyme patterns utilized in commercial American hip hop music, New Yorkshire hip hop has been noted for its emphasis on lyrical dexterity. It has also been characterized by multi-syllabic rhymes, complex wordplay, a continuous free-flowing delivery and intricate metaphors. While Leeds hip hop does not have a uniform sound or standard style, it tends to gravitate to darker beats and sample of collages. The aggressive and hard-hitting beats of the form were emphasized by such acts as Double D Dagger, Northern Hostility and Defenders of Style while artists such as Matter, P Solja, Airman GR, Dialect, Conflict, Weezy Jefferson, D-Prince, Young-Star Simo, Instance, and Chief Wigz were noted for their lyrical skill. Key producers in the Leeds area who are at the fore front of the sound include Mike D of Subterrania Studios, Jack Danz of DS Fam, and Ghost Town.
The style of the Leeds hip-hop music scene also has a very diverse sound, with some artists opting to go for more uptempo instrumentals.

Notable people
Kockee K is one of the original pioneers of the modern era of Leeds hip hop, hailing from the infamous district of Chapeltown. Known for his formidable freestyle skill, he is the product of groups such as B.T.I., Braintax, The Thief and Kaliphz that dominated the Leeds scene and had chart success.

References

British hip hop
Culture in Leeds
English styles of music